Campus protest or student protest is a form of student activism that takes the form of protest at university campuses. Such protests encompass a wide range of activities that indicate student dissatisfaction with a given political or academics issue and mobilization to communicate this dissatisfaction to the authorities (university or civil or both) and society in general and hopefully remedy the problem. Protest forms include but are not limited to: sit-ins, occupations of university offices or buildings, strikes etc. More extreme forms include suicide such as the case of Jan Palach's, and Jan Zajíc's protests against the end of the Prague Spring and Kostas Georgakis' protest against the Greek military junta of 1967–1974.

History 
In the West, student protests such as strikes date to the early days of universities in the Middle Ages, with some of the earliest being the University of Oxford strike of 1209, and the University of Paris strike of 1229, which lasted two years.

More widespread student demonstrations occurred in 19th century Europe, for example in Imperial Russia. In 1930s, some Polish students protested against anti-Semitic ghetto benches legislation. In the second half of the 20th century, significant demonstrations almost-simultaneously in many countries: the May 1968 events in France began as a series of student strikes; Polish political crisis that occurred the same year also saw a major student activism; and the Mexican Movement of 1968 also started with students. The largest student strike in the history of the United States occurred in May and June 1970, in the aftermath of the American invasion of Cambodia and the killings of student protesters at Kent State University in Ohio. An estimated four million students at more than 450 universities, colleges and high schools participated in what became known as the Student Strike of 1970.

It has been argued that student strikes and activism have a similarly long history in Confucian Asia.

Participation and issues 

Early studies of campus protests conducted in the United States in the mid-1960s suggested that students who were more likely to take part in the protests tended to come from middle class and upper middle class backgrounds, major in social sciences and humanities, and come from families with liberal political views. Later studies from early 1970s, however, suggested that participation in protests was broader, through still more likely for students from social sciences and humanities than more vocational-oriented fields like economy or engineering.  Student protesters were also more likely to describe themselves as having liberal or centrist political beliefs, and feeling politically alienated, lacking confidence in the party system and public officials.

Early campus protests in the United States were described as left-leaning and liberal.  More recent research shares a similar view, suggesting that right-leaning, conservative students and faculty are less likely to organize or join campus protests. A study of campus protests in the United States in the early 1990s identified major themes for approximately 60% of over two hundred incidents covered by media as multiculturalism and identity struggle, or in more detail as racial and ethnic struggle, women's concerns, or gay rights activities and represent what recent scholars have described both affectionately and pejoratively as "culture/cultural wars," "campus wars," "multicultural unrest," or "identity politics"... The remaining examples of student protest concerned funding (including tuition concerns), governance, world affairs, and environmental causes".

While less common, protests similar to campus protests can also happen at secondary-level education facilities, like high schools.

Forms 

Repertoire of contention in campus protests can take various forms, from peaceful sit-ins, marches, teach-ins, to more active forms that can spread off-campus and include violent clashes with the authorities. Campus protests can also involve faculty members participating in them in addition to students, through protests led by or organized by faculty, rather than students, are a minority. Just like students can worry about being expelled for participation in the protests, some faculty members are concerned about their job security if they were to become involved in such incidents.

A common tactic of student protest is to go on strike (sometimes called a boycott of classes), which occurs when students enrolled at a teaching institution such as a school, college or university refuse to go to class. It is meant to resemble strike action by organized labour. Whereas a normal strike is intended to inflict economic damage to an employer, a student strike is more of a logistical threat: the concerned institution or government cannot afford to have a large number of students simultaneously fail to graduate. The term "student strike" has been criticized as inaccurate by some unions and commentators in the news media. These groups have indicated that they believe the term boycott is more accurate.

Student protests can often spread off-campus and grow in scale, mobilizing off campus activists and organizations, for example the 2014 Hong Kong class boycott campaign led to the city-wide 2014 Hong Kong protests.

Response and aftermath 
Over time, university tolerance of campus protests have grown; while protests occurred before the 20th century they were more likely to be "crushed... with an iron fist... by university leaders" than by mid-20th century, when they have become much more common and tolerated. By the early 21st century, the university response to campus protest in the United States is much more likely to be negotiations, and willingness to yield at least to some of the student demands. There was a resurgence of student activism in the United States in 2015. In Germany, tuition in public universities were abolished in response to student protests between 2006-2012.)

University response to student activism and campus protests can still be much harsher in less liberal countries like China or Taiwan. In 1980 student protests in South Korea were violently suppressed by the military (the Gwangju Uprising). As recently as in 1989 a large scale student demonstration in China that moved off-campus, the 1989 Tiananmen Square protests and massacre, was met with deadly force.

Examples

2022 Universidad Autónoma de Querétaro (Querétaro, México) strike and occupation
2022 Huntington High School walkout
2021 Newport High School Student Demonstration
 2021 Boğaziçi University protests
 2021 Columbia University strike
 2020 Thai protests
 2019-2020 Iraq student protestsRef.?
 2019 JNU Protests in New Delhi  – IndiaRef.?
 2018-2020 "Fridays for Future" School strike for climate  – global 
 2018 Bangladesh road safety protests
 2018 "March for Our Lives" student protest  – United States
 2017–18 Mahatma Gandhi Central University protests  – India
 2017–18 Iranian protests
 2017 Jallikattu protests  – India
 2016 SATs Strike protest against tests for 6 and 7 year olds  – UK
 2016 Boston Public School students walkout in protest of budget cuts  – United StatesRef.?
 2016 Joint Student protests in Central Universities IndiaRef.?
 2016 JNU Student Protests in New Delhi  – IndiaRef.? 
 2015 "Fees Must Fall"  – South Africa
 2015 University of Missouri protests  – United States
 2015 Bangladesh student protests
 2015 University of Amsterdam Bungehuis and Maagdenhuis Occupations  – Netherlands
 2014 Jadavpur University protests  – India
 2014 Hong Kong student protest for democracy
 2014 Sunflower Student Movement  – Taiwan
 2014 Iguala mass kidnapping  – Mexico
 2012 Quebec student protests  – Canada
 2012 Valencia student protests
 2011 student protests in Chile
 2010 University of Puerto Rico Strike
 2010 UK student protests
 2008 Greek riots
 2007 Dutch pupil strike
 2006 student protests in Chile
 2006 student uprising in Iran
 2005 Quebec student protests  – Canada
 July 1999 Iran student protests
 1996–1997 protests in Serbia
 1996 Quebec student protests  – Canada
 1989 Tiananmen Square protests and massacre - China
1989 Anti-SAP riots - Nigeria
1980 student protests in Kabul - Afghanistan
 1978 "Ali Must Go" protests – Nigeria
 1976-77 Soweto uprising  – South Africa
 November 1973 Athens Polytechnic uprising  – Greece
 1971 Diliman Commune – Philippines
 1970-1972 Huelga schools, Houston  – United States
 1970 Student Strike – United States
 1968 Protests
 1968–69 Japanese university protests
 Third World Liberation Front strikes of 1968-1969  – United States
 1968 student demonstrations in Yugoslavia
 May 1968 uprisings – France
 1968 protests in Poland
 1968 East L.A. walkouts  – United States
 1965 Anti-Hindi agitations of Tamil Nadu - India
 1964-65 U.C. Berkeley Free Speech Movement  – United States
 1960 Anpo protests - Japan
 1956 Bucharest student movement  – Romania
 1901-1904 Września children strike  – Poland
 1766 Butter rebellion at Harvard University  – United States
 1229 University of Paris strike – France

See also 
Academic Crisis
Civil disobedience
Campus police
Social movement
Student voice

References

External links
Bloodiest Student Protests – slideshow by Life magazine
Occupy Wall Street Protests Shifting to College Campuses

Protest